London Tyler Holmes (born March 27, 1991), known professionally as London on da Track, is an American record producer, rapper, and songwriter. He is a frequent collaborator of fellow Atlanta rapper Young Thug and has also worked with Kodak Black, Birdman, Lil Wayne, Lil Baby, Rich Homie Quan, Gucci Mane, Giggs, Drake, Post Malone, T.I., 21 Savage, 50 Cent, Sfera Ebbasta, Summer Walker, Roddy Ricch and Ariana Grande, among others.

Early life
Holmes was born on March 27, 1991 in Memphis, Tennessee, but moved to Atlanta, Georgia, where he spent the majority of his childhood. He learned to play piano and keyboards during church. After high school, Holmes briefly attended Full Sail University in Florida, although he never graduated.

Career
London began rapping at the age of sixteen with the group Dem Guyz. The group used to download beats on SoundClick for 99 cents, although most of the beats cost $100 for exclusive rights. As a way to save money, London drew upon his experience playing piano arrangements in church and began making beats for rappers. With the help of online software he was able to refine his craft. He gained local acclaim when he began producing beats for the Rich Kidz . Soon after, others began asking for his compositions. Early on in his career, London would give away his beats for free as a means to build connections and garner more publicity. The first song he produced that received radio play was "Pieon" by Rich Kidz. The success of "Pieon" motivated London to continue producing. In 2011, he recorded his first of many collaborations with Young Thug, "Curtains". London continued to give his beats away for free before signing his first label deal with Cash Money Records.

In August 2014, American rapper and Cash Money Records chief executive officer (CEO) Bryan "Birdman" Williams, called London "the best producer in the business, as we speak today". London's frequent collaborator, Atlanta-based rapper Young Thug has stated London is his favorite producer to work with and will go down as "the greatest producer ever". Complex included him on their 2013 list of "25 New Producers To Watch For". In August 2014, three singles, produced by London on da Track, charted on the Billboard Hot 100 at the same time, with "Lifestyle" at 16, "About the Money" at 42, and "Hookah" at 85. In 2018, he appeared in Black Ink Crew: Chicago. That same year, he was named to Spotify's Secret Genius Ambassador's list. In 2019, he appeared in Netflix's Rhythm + Flow, as a producer advisor in the finale.

In 2020, London worked with Ariana Grande on a song called "Positions", The song debuted at No. 1 on the US Billboard Hot 100, becoming his first chart topper as a composer, lyricist and a producer. The song also debuted at No. 1 on the Billboard Global 200 and Billboard Global Excl. U.S. chart.

Personal life
Holmes has 4 children; a daughter with singer Summer Walker born in 2021, as well as another daughter and 2 sons from previous relationships.

Discography

Mixtapes
The DefAnition (with Dae Dae) (2016)

Singles

As lead artist

As featured artist

Production discography

Charting singles

References

External links

 

1991 births
African-American record producers
American hip hop record producers
Cash Money Records artists
Living people
Musicians from Atlanta
Southern hip hop musicians
Ableton Live users
21st-century African-American people